The 1931 Bucknell Bison football team was an American football team that represented Bucknell University as an independent during the 1931 college football season. In its fifth season under head coach Carl Snavely, the team compiled a 6–0–3 record.

The team played its home games at Christy Mathewson Memorial Stadium in Lewisburg, Pennsylvania.

Schedule

References

Bucknell
Bucknell Bison football seasons
College football undefeated seasons
Bucknell Bison football